The 2020 Cavalry FC season was the second season in the history of Cavalry FC. In the previous season, Cavalry won both the spring and fall seasons but lost in the finals to Forge FC.

On March 20, 2020 the league announced a postponement of the start of the season due to the COVID-19 pandemic.

Squad 
As of September 9, 2020

Transfers

In

Draft picks 
Cavalry selected the following players in the 2019 CPL–U Sports Draft on November 11, 2019. Draft picks are not automatically signed to the team roster. Only those who are signed to a contract will be listed as transfers in.

Loans In

Out

Loans Out

Canadian Premier League

Match times are Mountain Daylight Time (UTC−6).

First stage

Table

Results by match

Matches

Group stage

Table

Results by round

Matches

Statistics

Squad and statistics 

|-

  

 
 

 
 
 
 
 
 
 
 
 

 
 
 
 
|-
|}

Top scorers 
{| class="wikitable sortable alternance"  style="font-size:85%; text-align:center; line-height:14px; width:85%;"
|-
!width=10|Rank
!width=10|Nat.
! scope="col" style="width:275px;"|Player
!width=10|Pos.
!width=80|Canadian Premier League
!width=80|TOTAL
|-
|rowspan=2|1|||| Nathan Mavila || DF || 3 ||3
|-
|||| Jordan Brown || FW || 3 ||3
|-
|rowspan=1|3|||| Marcus Haber || FW || 2 ||2
|-
|rowspan=6|4|||| Sergio Camargo || MF || 1 ||1
|-
||| Dominick Zator || DF || 1 ||1
|-
||| Elijah Adekugbe || MF || 1 ||1
|-
||| Mohamed Farsi || MF || 1 ||1
|-
||| Nik Ledgerwood || MF || 1 ||1
|-
||| Jair Córdova || FW || 1 ||1
|- class="sortbottom"
| colspan="4"|Totals||14||14

Top assists 
{| class="wikitable sortable alternance"  style="font-size:85%; text-align:center; line-height:14px; width:85%;"
|-
!width=10|Rank
!width=10|Nat.
! scope="col" style="width:275px;"|Player
!width=10|Pos.
!width=80|Canadian Premier League
!width=80|TOTAL
|-
|rowspan=5|1|||| Elijah Adekugbe || MF || 1 ||1
|-
||| Mohamed Farsi         || MF || 1 ||1
|-
||| Nik Ledgerwood         || MF || 1 ||1
|-
||| Oliver || FW || 1 || 1
|-
||| Nathan Mavila         || DF || 1 ||1
|- class="sortbottom"
| colspan="4"|Totals||5||5

Clean sheets 
{| class="wikitable sortable alternance"  style="font-size:85%; text-align:center; line-height:14px; width:85%;"
|-
!width=10|Rank
!width=10|Nat.
! scope="col" style="width:275px;"|Player
!width=80|Canadian Premier League
!width=80|TOTAL
|-
|1|||| Marco Carducci   || 3 ||3
|-
|- class="sortbottom"
| colspan="3"|Totals||3||3

Disciplinary record 
{| class="wikitable sortable alternance"  style="font-size:85%; text-align:center; line-height:14px; width:85%;"
|-
!rowspan="2" width=10|No.
!rowspan="2" width=10|Pos.
!rowspan="2" width=10|Nat.
!rowspan="2" scope="col" style="width:275px;"|Player
!colspan="2" width=80|Canadian Premier League
!colspan="2" width=80|TOTAL
|-
! !!  !!  !! 
|-
|1||GK|||| Marco Carducci    ||1||0||1||0
|-
|3||DF|||| Nathan Mavila    ||1||0||1||0
|-
|6||DF|||| Nik Ledgerwood    ||1||0||1||0
|-
|8||MF|||| Elijah Adekugbe    ||2||0||2||0
|-
|10||MF|||| Sergio Camargo    ||1||0||1||0
|-
|14||DF|||| Jonathan Wheeldon ||1||1||1||1
|-
|15||MF|||| Elliot Simmons ||1||0||1||0
|-
|20||FW|||| José Hernández ||1||0||1||0
|-
|21||DF|||| Mohamed Farsi    ||2||0||2||0
|-
|25||DF|||| Robert Boskovic    ||2||0||2||0
|-
|29||FW|||| Marcus Haber    ||1||0||1||0
|- class="sortbottom"
| colspan="4"|Totals||14||1||14||1

Notes

References

External links 
Official site

2020
2020 Canadian Premier League
Canadian soccer clubs 2020 season
2020 in Alberta